The 1930 Cork Intermediate Hurling Championship was the 21st staging of the Cork Intermediate Hurling Championship since its establishment by the Cork County Board.

Passage won the championship following a 4-1 to 1-3 defeat of Buttevant in the final. This was their second championship title overall and their first since 1924.

Results

Final

References

Cork Intermediate Hurling Championship
Cork Intermediate Hurling Championship